Aztec influence in Spain can be seen in both the cuisine of Spain and in its architecture.

Food
Guacamole, an avocado-based dip that was popular in Aztec cuisine as early as the 16th century, was brought back to Spain by the Conquistadors.

Architecture

The stone work of sun pattern, snakes, panther and birds above the main entrance to the church of Nuestra Señora de Regla, Pájara, Fuerteventura in the Canary Islands, is thought by some specialists to show Aztec influence.

See also 
 Columbian exchange
Nahuatl–Spanish contact

References

Aztec
Cultural history of Spain
Legacies
Spanish colonization of the Americas
Cultural exchange